This is a list of large extant primate species (excluding humans) that can be ordered by average weight or height range. There is no fixed definition of a large primate, it is typically assessed empirically. Primates exhibit the highest levels of sexual dimorphism amongst mammals, therefore the maximum body dimensions included in this list generally refer to male specimens.

Mandrills and baboons are monkeys; the rest of the species on this list are apes. Typically, Old World monkeys (paleotropical) are larger than New World monkeys (neotropical); the reasons for this are not entirely understood but several hypotheses have been generated. As a rule, primate brains are "significantly larger" than those of other mammals with similar body sizes. Until well into the 19th century, juvenile orangutans were taken from the wild and died within short order, eventually leading naturalists to mistakenly assume that the living specimens they briefly encountered and skeletons of adult orangutans were entirely different species.

Largest non-human primates

See also 
Largest wild canids
List of largest land carnivorans
Monkey
Great apes
List of heaviest land mammals
Largest mammals
Sexual dimorphism in non-human primates

References

Further reading
 
 
 
 Body Mass in Lowland Gorillas: A Quantitative Analysis (2019)

External links
 AlltheWorldsPrimates.org

Heaviest or most massive organisms
Lists of largest animals
Lists of primates
Primate anatomy